Ricardo Paseyro (1925, Mercedes –2009) was an Uruguayan diplomat and poet.

1925 births
2009 deaths
Uruguayan diplomats
Uruguayan male poets
20th-century Uruguayan poets
20th-century Uruguayan male writers